This page is a list of the owners and executives of the Cincinnati Reds.

The Cincinnati Reds are an American professional baseball team based in Cincinnati, Ohio. The Reds compete in Major League Baseball (MLB) as a member club of the National League (NL) Central division. They were a charter member of the American Association in 1882 and joined the NL in 1890.

Owners

 Johnson owned the team briefly during the 1890-91 offseason before selling the club to John T. Brush.

 With Weil on the verge of bankruptcy the Central Trust Bank took over ownership of the club in November of 1933. Powel Crosley purchased the team in February of 1934.

Source:

General Managers

Larry MacPhail
Warren Giles
Gabe Paul
Bill DeWitt
Bob Howsam
Dick Wagner
Bob Howsam
Bill Bergesch
Murray Cook
Bob Quinn
Jim Bowden
Dan O'Brien
Wayne Krivsky
Walt Jocketty
Dick Williams
Nick Krall

Other executives

Howie Bedell (born 1935), farm system director
Sheldon "Chief" Bender (1919–2008), front office executive and consultant
Cam Bonifay (born 1952), special assistant to the general manager
Larry Doughty (born c. 1940), director of scouting
Nathan Menderson (1820–1904), vice president
Greg Rhodes, (2007-Current) team historian
Phil Seghi (1909–1987), director of scouting
Tal Smith (born 1933), office of the general manager
Jerry Walker (born 1939), special assistant to the general manager
Woody Woodward (born 1942), assistant general manager

References

Further reading

External links
Baseball America: Executive Database

 
 
Cincinnati
Owners and executives